Jibri Blount (born October 21, 1996) is an American football tight end who is a free agent. He played college basketball for the Cleveland State Vikings and the North Carolina Central Eagles. He converted to football and signed with the Miami Dolphins in 2021.

Early life and high school career
Blount was raised in Pittsburgh, Pennsylvania, and attended Linsly School for two years. He transferred to St. Vincent–St. Mary High School in Akron, Ohio, where he was coached by Dru Joyce II. In September 2014, Blount committed to Cleveland State. As a senior, Blount was a second-team all-district and All-Ohio honoree after averaging 16.0 points and 11.0 rebounds per game, leading the team to a 16–1 record.

College career
As a freshman at Cleveland State, Blount averaged 5.7 points per game. After his sophomore season, Blount decided to transfer to North Carolina Central and sat out the 2017–18 season as a redshirt. As a junior, Blount averaged 10.1 points and 4.4 rebounds per game. Blount scored 33 points, which matched his career high, and grabbed 10 rebounds on January 25, 2020, helping North Carolina Central to a 72–45 victory over Delaware State. On February 10, Blount scored 20 points, including the game-winning basket with 2.2 seconds left, and pulled down nine rebounds in a 58–57 win against Morgan State. He was named Mid-Eastern Athletic Conference (MEAC) player of the week five times. At the conclusion of the regular season, Blount earned MEAC Player of the Year honors. He averaged 19.1 points and 9.3 rebounds per game and led the MEAC in steals.

College statistics

|-
| style="text-align:left;"| 2015–16
| style="text-align:left;"| Cleveland State
| 29 || 5 || 16.7 || .492 || .500 || .620 || 3.1 || .5 || .9 || .4 || 5.7
|-
| style="text-align:left;"| 2016–17
| style="text-align:left;"| Cleveland State
| 30 || 10 || 15.0 || .410 || .289 || .667 || 2.2 || .5 || .7 || .2 || 3.8
|-
| style="text-align:left;"| 2017–18
| style="text-align:left;"| North Carolina Central
| style="text-align:center;" colspan="11"|  Redshirt
|-
| style="text-align:left;"| 2018–19
| style="text-align:left;"| North Carolina Central
| 24 || 0 || 21.9 || .492 || .288 || .736 || 4.4 || 1.6 || 1.0 || .4 || 10.1
|-
| style="text-align:left;"| 2019–20
| style="text-align:left;"| North Carolina Central
| 31 || 31 || 36.8 || .525 || .319 || .712 || 9.3 || 1.6 || 2.1 || .6 || 19.1
|- class="sortbottom"
| style="text-align:center;" colspan="2"| Career
| 114 || 46 || 22.8 || .498 || .307 || .696 || 4.8 || 1.1 || 1.2 || .4 || 9.8

Professional career

Miami Dolphins
On May 6, 2021, Blount signed with the Miami Dolphins of the NFL as a tight end. He was waived on July 26, 2021.

Arlington Renegades
Blount was assigned to the Arlington Renegades of the XFL on January 6, 2023.

Personal life
Blount's father is Mel Blount, an NFL Hall of Fame inductee who played for the Pittsburgh Steelers. When Jibri was in third grade, he brought two of his father's championship rings to class without telling him. His older brother Akil was signed by the Miami Dolphins in 2016, and younger brother Khalid plays football for Duquesne.

References

External links
North Carolina Central Eagles bio

1996 births
Living people
American football tight ends
American men's basketball players
Arlington Renegades players
Basketball players from Pittsburgh
Cleveland State Vikings men's basketball players
Miami Dolphins players
North Carolina Central Eagles men's basketball players
Players of American football from Pennsylvania
Power forwards (basketball)
St. Vincent–St. Mary High School alumni